How to Play the Piano was a British television series which was aired in 1950 on BBC. In the programme, Sidney Harrison showed how to play the piano to a pupil, Edward Goodwin. Episode titles included "how to practise", "how to play with expression", and "how do you play?". It aired in a 30-minute time-slot.

See also
Piano Lesson TV series

References

External links
How to Play the Piano on IMDb
how long does it take to learn piano
How to Learn How to Play Piano

1950s British music television series
1950 British television series debuts
1950 British television series endings
Lost BBC episodes
BBC Television shows
Black-and-white British television shows
British live television series